Leaky gut refers to:

 Increased intestinal permeability, the phenomenon whereby the intestine wall exhibits excessive permeability
 Leaky gut syndrome, a hypothetical, medically unrecognized condition sustained mainly by practitioners of alternative medicine and some nutritionists